La Booga Rooga was the second solo album by Andy Fairweather Low, and was released by A&M Records in 1975.

It was Fairweather Low's most successful album, with an eclectic musical styling.  The opening track was a cover of Clarence Williams' 1933 penned track "My Bucket's Got a Hole in It", which incorporated steel guitar playing by B. J. Cole. Another offering, "Champagne Melody", was styled as lounge music, whilst the album's funk-driven title track became a minor UK hit in March 1976, when covered by an Australian female vocal group, The Surprise Sisters.

The album also contained Fairweather Low's biggest selling single, "Wide Eyed and Legless", which reached No. 6 in the UK Singles Chart at  Christmas time in 1975. However, his earlier single release of "La Booga Rooga" in September that year, failed to chart. Leo Sayer covered "La Booga Rooga" on his 1978 album, Leo Sayer.

Track listing
All tracks composed by Andy Fairweather Low, except where noted.

Side 1
 "My Bucket's Got a Hole in It" (Clarence Williams)  – 3:11
 "Jump Up and Turn Around"  – 4:02
 "Halfway to Everything"  – 4:04
 "La Booga Rooga"  – 4:11
 "Champagne Melody"  – 3:03

Side 2
 "If That's What It Takes"  – 3:29
 "8 Ton Crazy"  – 3:29
 "Grease It Up"  – 3:10
 "Wide Eyed and Legless"  – 4:00
 "Inner City Highwayman"  – 4:40

Personnel
Andrew Fairweather Low - acoustic and electric guitar, vocals
Bud Beadle – baritone saxophone
John "Rabbit" Bundrick – piano, electric piano, organ, Clavinet
Doreen Chanter – backing vocals
Irene Chanter – backing vocals
B. J. Cole – pedal steel guitar, dobro
John David – bass guitar, backing vocals
Joe Egan – backing vocals
Georgie Fame – piano, organ, brass arrangements
Benny Gallagher – high-strung guitar, vocals, accordion
Steve Gregory – alto saxophone, brass arrangements
Jimmy Jewell – tenor saxophone
Glyn Johns – cabasa, engineering, production
Kenney Jones – drums, percussion
Bernie Leadon – acoustic guitar, banjo
Graham Lyle – 12-string guitar, electric rhythm guitar, backing vocals
Dave Mattacks – drums
Gerry Rafferty – backing vocals
Brian Rogers – string arrangements
Bruce Rowland – drums
Barry St. John – backing vocals
Liza Strike – backing vocals
Eddie "Tan Tan" Thornton – trumpet
Joanne Williams – backing vocals
Technical
Fabio Nicoli - art direction
Nick Marshall - design
Gered Mankowitz - photography

Later issues
In 2006, the album was released on CD.

References

External links
La Booga Rooga at Discogs.com

1975 albums
Andy Fairweather Low albums
Albums produced by Glyn Johns
A&M Records albums